James Kingsley (6 January 1797 – 10 August 1878) was an attorney and mayor of Ann Arbor from 1855 to 1856.

Attorney James "Honest Jim" Kingsley, who came to Ann Arbor in 1826, was the first member of the Washtenaw County Bar, a probate judge, and a member of both the territorial and later the state legislature, as well as Ann Arbor's second mayor and a regent of the University of Michigan.

Kingsley Street in Ann Arbor is named after him.

Sources 
 James Kingsley: Ann Arbor District Library
 History of the University of Michigan, By Burke Aaron Hinsdale Published by the University of Michigan, 1906; p. 182
 Kingsley Family Papers, 1830-1901, Bentley Historical Library.

1797 births
1878 deaths
Mayors of Ann Arbor, Michigan
Regents of the University of Michigan
Members of the Michigan Territorial Legislature
Michigan state senators
Members of the Michigan House of Representatives
19th-century American politicians
19th-century American lawyers
19th-century American judges
People from Ann Arbor, Michigan